To "slew" means to turn without change of place.

A slewing bearing or slew[ing] ring (also called a turntable bearing) is a rotational rolling-element bearing that typically supports a heavy but slow-turning or slowly-oscillating loads in combination (axial, radial and moment loads), often a horizontal platform such as a conventional crane, a swing yarder, or the wind-facing platform of a horizontal-axis (yaw) windmill. In other orientations (e.g. a horizontal axis of rotation) they are used in materials handling grapples, forklift attachments, welding turnover jigs and so on.

Compared to a "normal" ball bearing the rings are quite wide and usually have holes drilled in them to provide fixation to a structure. Seals can be provided between the rings to protect the rolling elements. Compared to other rolling-element bearings, slewing bearings are relatively thin section and require that the structure to which they are bolted is stiff enough so that under load predefined limits of distortion are not exceeded.

Slewing rings range in size from as little as 100mm diameter to well over 15 000mm (often segmented at this size for easy transport and handling); for example the bearings on the Falkirk Wheel are 4 meters diameter and fit over a 3.5 meter axle. Slewing bearings are often made with gear teeth integral with the inner or outer race (or both in rare cases) used to drive the platform relative to the base (for example in winches).

Slewing bearing designs range from single row ball or roller style, through double row ball or roller, triple row roller, combined (1 roller/ 1 ball) or wore guided raceways - each design having its own special characteristics and application. Old designs can have split rings to allow tight control on preload during assembly.

As for other bearings that reciprocate, rather than rotating continuously, lubrication can be difficult. The oil wedge built up in a continuously rotating bearing is disrupted by the stop start motion of slewing. Instead, a hydrostatic bearing with pumped oil flow may be used.

Standards 
Most manufacturers of slewing rings have their own set of manufacturing standards but the American Society of Mechanical Engineers (ASME) publishes the following Standard:

ASME SRB-1 on Design, Installation, Maintenance, and Application of Ball Slewing Ring Bearings

Bearings (mechanical)